Paraferrimonas sedimenticola is a bacterium from the genus of Paraferrimonas which has been isolated from sediments from the coast of Okinawa Island in Japan.

References

External links
Type strain of Paraferrimonas sedimenticola at BacDive -  the Bacterial Diversity Metadatabase

Bacteria described in 2007
Alteromonadales